Musaabad (also Romanized as Mūsáābād; also known as Mūsīān) is a village in Jabal Rural District, Kuhpayeh District, Isfahan County, Isfahan Province, Iran. At the 2006 census, its population was 16, in 4 families.

References 

Populated places in Isfahan County